Westgard may refer to
Westgard (surname)
Westgard Pass in California, U.S.
Westgard Rules for laboratory quality control